Linda F. Hogan (born 1964) is an Irish ethicist, ecumenist and academic, specialising in Christian ethics, political ethics, human rights, gender, and ecumenism. She is Professor of Ecumenics at Trinity College Dublin, where she was also its vice-provost from 2011 to 2016. She worked as a lecturer at the University of Chester and University of Leeds before joining the staff of Trinity College, Dublin.

Early life and education
Hogan is from Callan, County Kilkenny, Republic of Ireland. She was educated at St. Brigid's College, an all-girls Catholic school in Callan. She studied history and theology at National University of Ireland Maynooth and St Patrick's College, Maynooth (a Catholic seminary and pontifical university that shares NUIM's campus), graduating with a Bachelor of Arts (BA) degree. She remained at Maynooth to study for a two-year Master of Arts (MA) degree. Then moved to Trinity College Dublin, to undertake research in theology for her Doctor of Philosophy (PhD) degree, which she completed in 1991.

Academic career
Hogan began her academic career as a lecturer in ethics and religion at the University of Chester, England, for the 1992/93 academic year. During this time, she met Fr James F. Keenan, a Jesuit and ethicist: together, they would found the Catholic Theological Ethics in the World Church in 2003. After a year teaching at Chester, she moved to the University of Leeds, England, as a lecturer in gender, ethics and religion in its Department of Theology and Religious Studies. She was part of the university's Centre for Gender and Women's Studies and its Centre for Business Ethics. 

In 2001, Hogan returned to Trinity College, Dublin as a lecturer in its School of Ecumenics. She was a visiting professor at the Sydney College of Divinity and the Melbourne College of Divinity in 2005. In 2006, she was awarded the Chair of Ecumenics, and served as Head of School and Director of the Irish School of Ecumenics from 2006 to 2010. From 2011 to 2016, she was Vice-Provost and Chief Academic Officer of Trinity College Dublin. In 2021 she was considered for the role of Provost of the college when the position was being considered for one of three women, including Linda Doyle and Jane Ohlmeyer, making it the first time a woman was provost since the founding of the college: Doyle was subsequently elected.

Views
In 2012, Hogan was a sponsor of the Catholic Scholars' Declaration on Authority in the Church: amongst other things, this called for more autonomy for bishops, active laity involvement in church governance, and democracy in the selection of bishops and other church leaders.

In reference to the 2015 referendum on same-sex marriage, Hogan argued that there was no theological impediment to same-sex civil marriage and that the "Christian tradition affirms the fundamental equality and dignity of all people, whether we are heterosexual or gay".

Honours
In 2007, she was made a Fellow of Trinity College, Dublin, an honorary appointment.

In 2013, it was suggested that Pope Francis might appoint her as the first female cardinal of the Roman Catholic Church. She had been nominated by Fr James Keenan SJ.

Selected works
 From women's experience to feminist theology (1998) Sheffield Academic Press, Sheffield  
 Confronting the truth: conscience in the Catholic tradition (2000) Paulist Press, New York, NY  
 
 
 
 Keeping Faith with Human Rights (Moral Traditions series) (2015) Georgetown University Press, Washington, DC

References

External links
 

 

 
 
 
 

1964 births
Living people
Irish ethicists
Christian ethicists
Irish human rights activists
People in Christian ecumenism
Alumni of St Patrick's College, Maynooth
Alumni of Trinity College Dublin
Fellows of Trinity College Dublin
Christian feminist theologians
20th-century Irish Roman Catholic theologians
21st-century Irish Roman Catholic theologians